Izaias Maia Carneiro (born June 5, 1975), known as Izaias, is a former Brazilian football player.

Club statistics

References

External links

1975 births
Living people
Brazilian footballers
Brazilian expatriate footballers
J2 League players
Yokohama FC players
Expatriate footballers in Japan
Association football forwards